William II (25 February 1848 – 2 October 1921) was the last King of Württemberg. He ruled from 6 October 1891 until the dissolution of the kingdom on 30 November 1918. He was the last German ruler to abdicate in the wake of the November Revolution of 1918.

Early years
William was born the son of Prince Frederick of Württemberg (1808–1870) by his wife Princess Catherine Frederica of Württemberg (1821–1898), herself the daughter of King William I of Württemberg (1781–1864). His parents were first cousins, being the children of two brothers, and William was their only child.

William's growing years coincided with a progressive diminution of Württemberg's sovereignty and international presence, concomitant with the process of German unification. In 1870, Württemberg took the side of Prussia in the Franco-German War. In 1871, Württemberg became a state of the German Empire, a significant limitation on its sovereignty.

King of Württemberg

William's father died in 1870, but his mother lived to see him seated on the throne of Württemberg. In 1891, William succeeded his childless maternal uncle, King Charles I (1823–1891) and became King of Württemberg. This was not, as it may seem, a departure from the Salic law which governed succession in the German states; his claim to the throne came because he was the nearest agnatic heir of his maternal uncle, as the senior male-line descendant of Frederick I of Württemberg through his younger son Prince Paul. 

King William became a Generalfeldmarschall during World War I. In 1918, he was deposed from the throne along with the other German rulers. King William finally abdicated on 30 November 1918, ending over 800 years of Württemberg rule. He died in 1921 at Bebenhausen.

Personality and interests
Considered to be a popular monarch, William had the habit of walking his two dogs in public parks in Stuttgart without being attended by bodyguards or the like. During these excursions, he would often be greeted by his subjects with a simple Herr König ("Mister King").

Despite living in a landlocked kingdom, William II was a yachting enthusiast. The king was instrumental in the establishment of the Württembergischer Yacht Club (formerly "Königlich Württembergischer Yacht-Club" or Royal Yacht Club of Württemberg) in 1911 on Lake Constance.

Marriages and children
On 15 February 1877 at Arolsen he married Princess Marie of Waldeck and Pyrmont (1857–1882). They had three children:
Princess Pauline of Württemberg (19 December 18777 May 1965); married in 1898 William Frederick, Prince of Wied (1872–1945), and had issue.
Prince Ulrich of Württemberg (28 July 188028 December 1880), died in infancy
A stillborn daughter (24 April 1882)

Marie died on 30 April 1882 in Stuttgart, from complications resulting from the birth of their third child. William, already depressed by the death of his only son, is said never to have recovered from this blow.

Nevertheless, he was King and it was his duty to secure the succession. On 8 April 1886, at Bückeburg, he married Princess Charlotte of Schaumburg-Lippe (1864–1946). They had no children.

Succession
On William II's death in 1921 without male issue, the royal branch of the House of Württemberg became extinct, and the headship of the house devolved to Albrecht, Duke of Württemberg, head of the Roman Catholic cadet branch of the dynasty, based at Altshausen. Albrecht was a descendant of Alexander of Württemberg, the 7th son of Frederick II Eugene, Duke of Württemberg (1732–1797).

Honours
German awards

Foreign awards
   Austria-Hungary:
 Grand Cross of the Royal Hungarian Order of St. Stephen, 1886
 Military Merit Cross, 1st Class
 : Knight of the Annunciation, 25 September 1893
 : Grand Cordon of the Order of the Chrysanthemum, 23 May 1896
 : Grand Cross of the Netherlands Lion
 :
 Knight of St. Andrew
 Knight of St. Alexander Nevsky
 Knight of the White Eagle
 Knight of St. Anna, 1st Class
 Knight of St. Stanislaus, 1st Class
 Knight of St. George, 4th Class
 : Knight of the Golden Fleece, 3 May 1892
 : Knight of the Seraphim, 9 July 1913
 : Stranger Knight of the Garter, 23 February 1904

Arms

Ancestry

See also
 Rulers of Württemberg

References

External links
 

|-

|-

1848 births
1921 deaths
19th-century kings of Württemberg
20th-century kings of Württemberg
Nobility from Stuttgart
Field marshals of the German Empire
Kings of Württemberg
Protestant monarchs
German landowners
Members of the Württembergian Chamber of Lords
Monarchs who abdicated
Burials at Alter Friedhof, Ludwigsburg
Generals of Cavalry of Württemberg
German Army generals of World War I
Recipients of the Pour le Mérite (military class)
Extra Knights Companion of the Garter
Knights of the Golden Fleece of Spain
Grand Crosses of the Military Order of Max Joseph
Grand Crosses of the Order of Saint Stephen of Hungary
Recipients of the Order of the Netherlands Lion
Recipients of the Order of St. Anna, 1st class
Recipients of the Order of the White Eagle (Russia)
Recipients of the Order of St. George of the Fourth Degree
Recipients of the Iron Cross, 2nd class